Reno Lake is a lake in Crow Wing County, in the U.S. state of Minnesota.

Reno Lake was named for Jesse L. Reno, a United States Army officer killed in the Civil War.

See also
List of lakes in Minnesota

References

Lakes of Minnesota
Lakes of Crow Wing County, Minnesota